Kubbin, is a collection of 17 tales for children.
The tales were published in book form by the Faroese Teachers’ Association’s Publishing Company in 1974. Originally, the tales were written by the Norwegian writer Anne-Catharina Vestly whereupon the tales are translated to Faroese by Samuel Jacob Sesanus Olsen in the book Kubbin.

Table of contents
The titles on the 17 tales in the Kubbin are following:

 Kubbin
 Kubbin í krambúðini
 Kubbin í bundnum jakka
 Yrkismaður
 Mamman verður krambúðargenta
 Lítlibeiggi bjargar eini pannukøku
 Hjá snikkaranum
 Heim í myrkri
 Filippus stóribeiggi eigur vekjara
 Lítlibeiggi og Kubbin bukka
 Ruskveður
 Tanta Allastaðni og líla
 Eisini pápin sær yvir seg
 Húsið við ongum vindeygum
 Jólagrýlur
 Jólatræsveitsla
 Teir vitja prinsessuna

References 

Children's short story collections
Translations
Faroese literature
Norwegian children's literature
1974 short story collections
1974 children's books